Hugo Gorge (31 January 1883 – 25 December 1934) was an Austrian architect. His work was part of the architecture event in the art competition at the 1932 Summer Olympics.

References

1883 births
1934 deaths
20th-century Austrian architects
Olympic competitors in art competitions
People from Studénka